is a former Japanese football player. His brother is Ryosuke Sasagaki.

Playing career
Takuya Sasagaki joined to J2 League club; Roasso Kumamoto in 2010. From 2011, he entered International Budo University. In August 2014, he joined to J3 League club; Fujieda MYFC. He retired end of 2015 season.

References

External links

1991 births
Living people
International Budo University alumni
Association football people from Shizuoka Prefecture
Japanese footballers
J2 League players
J3 League players
Roasso Kumamoto players
Fujieda MYFC players
Association football forwards